The International Journal of Sport Nutrition and Exercise Metabolism is a scientific journal addressing topics in nutrition, exercise metabolism, and related fields.

Abstracting and indexing 
The journal is abstracted and indexed in Web of Science, AGRICOLA, BIOBASE, Chemical Abstracts, Current Awareness in Biological Sciences, Current Contents, EBSCOhost, EMBASE, Scopus, Excerpta Medica, MEDLINE, and the Science Citation Index.

External links 

Bimonthly journals
English-language journals
Nutrition and dietetics journals
Publications established in 1991
Sports medicine journals
Sports nutrition